The 2018–19 East Tennessee Buccaneers basketball team represented East Tennessee State University during the 2018–19 NCAA Division I men's basketball season. The Buccaneers, led by fourth-year head coach Steve Forbes, played their home games at the Freedom Hall Civic Center in Johnson City, Tennessee as of the Southern Conference. They finished the season 24–10, 13–5 in SoCon play to finish in a tie for third place. They defeated Chattanooga in the quarterfinals of the SoCon tournament before losing in the semifinals to Wofford. They were invited to the CollegeInsider.com Tournament where they lost in the first round to Green Bay.

Previous season
The Buccaneers finished the 2017–18 season 25–9, 14–4 in SoCon play to finish in second place. They defeated Chattanooga and Furman to advance to the championship game of the SoCon tournament where they lost to UNC Greensboro. Despite having 25 wins, they did not participate in a postseason tournament.

Roster

Schedule and results

|-
!colspan=9 style=| Exhibition

|-
!colspan=9 style=| Regular season

|-
!colspan=9 style=| SoCon tournament

|-
!colspan=12 style=| CollegeInsider.com Postseason tournament
|-

Source

References

East Tennessee State Buccaneers men's basketball seasons
East Tennessee State
East Tennessee
East Tennessee
East Tennessee State